Anaco Airport , is an airport serving Anaco, a city in the Anzoátegui state of Venezuela. The runway length includes a  displaced threshold on Runway 10.

See also
Transport in Venezuela
List of airports in Venezuela

References

External links
OurAirports - Anaco
SkyVector - Anaco
OpenStreetMap - Anaco

Airports in Venezuela
Buildings and structures in Anzoátegui